Jean Baptiste Virlogeux (1885–1958) was a French chef. He was the chef at the Savoy Hotel in London during the 1930s and later was the head chef of The Dorchester for 10 years, where he catered to the likes of Prince Philip and Elizabeth II.

References

1958 deaths
French chefs
French expatriates in England
1885 births